The Challenger de Gatineau, currently sponsored as Challenger Banque Nationale de Gatineau, is a professional tennis tournament played on outdoor hard courts. It is currently part of the ATP Challenger Tour and the ITF Women's Circuit. It has been held annually in Gatineau, Quebec, Canada, since 2014 for women and since 2016 for men.

Past finals

Men's singles

Women's singles

Men's doubles

Women's doubles

References

External links
Official website

 
ATP Challenger Tour
ITF Women's World Tennis Tour
Tennis tournaments in Canada
Hard court tennis tournaments
Sport in Gatineau
Tennis in Quebec
Recurring sporting events established in 2014
2014 establishments in Quebec